The Anshan-class destroyers were the People's Liberation Army Navy's (PLAN) first destroyers. They were ex-Soviet s purchased in the 1950s. The Chinese later added HY-2 anti-ship missiles and removed some of the torpedo tubes, and redesignated as Type 6607. All four ships of the class had been stricken by 1992.

Design 

The ships was powered by two sets of Tosi geared steam turbines with three drum boilers, with total power output of  distributed in two shafts. The ships has a complement of 205 personnel, including 15 officers.

The class were initially armed with four /50 caliber B13 Pattern 1936 guns in four turrets, two /55 34-K guns in two turrets, four 37 mm/63 70-K guns in single-mounts, one Oerlikon 20 mm/70 autocannon, and two triple-tube  torpedo tubes. In 1971-1974, all ships were modernized by replacing the two torpedo tubes with two twin HY-2 surface-to-surface missile launchers, the four Soviet single-mount 37 mm/63 70-K guns were replaced with four Chinese twin-mount 37 mm/63 Type 61 guns, and removal of the 76 mm guns and 20 mm autocannon. The ships also equipped with two projectors and two racks for depth charges and can carry up to 60 naval mines.

The ships electronics and sensors consisted of Mina fire-control system, Gius-2 (NATO code: "Cross Bird") air-search radar, "High Sieve" air/surface-search radar, "Square Tie" surface-search radar, "Ball End" and "Fin Curve" navigational radar, and Pegas-2M active sonar.

History 
After 1949 the PLAN negotiated with Britain through Hong Kong to buy some second-hand ships and boats but unable to do so due to the Korean War. As a result, the PLAN turned to the Soviet Union to buy four worn-out destroyers. The purchase was made on 4 June 1953, with prices equivalent to 17 tons of gold each at the time.

The Anshan-class ships were withdrawn from active service by the 1990s, but retained three ships as training ship (Taiyuan) and museum ships (Anshan and Changchun). The PLAN retains ownership of the ships through PLAN funded institutions.

Ships in class

References

Notes

Bibliography 
 
 
 
 
 

 
Destroyer classes
China–Soviet Union relations